Hope Bender (born January 2, 1997 in Newport Beach, California) is an American track and field athlete, known for multiple events and hurdles. She competes for the Santa Barbara Track Club. Bender studied to be a Biotechnology engineer.

Professional
Hope Bender competed in Des Moines, Iowa at the 2019 USA Track & Field Outdoor Championships and Clovis, California at the 2016 USATF Junior Championships.

Hope Bender competed in Albuquerque, New Mexico at the 2018 USA Indoor Track and Field Championships. She placed 5th in the 2018 USA Indoor Track and Field Championships pentathlon.

NCAA
Hope Bender is a UC Santa Barbara Gauchos alumna and won 6 Big West Conference titles.

Hope Bender is a 4-time USTFCCCA NCAA Division I All-American at UCSB.

UCSB's Bender finishes fourth at 2019 NCAA outdoor track and field championship.

UCSB Gauchos’s Hope Bender Named Athlete of Meet at 2019 Big West Championships hosted by UC Santa Barbara Gauchos track and field helping the women's team to place 2nd in Big West Championships.

UCSB Gauchos’s Hope Bender Named Athlete of Meet at 2018 Big West Championships hosted by Cal State Northridge Matadors.

Prep and personal life
Hope Bender competed for Newport Harbor High School alma mater.

While at Newport Beach, California Newport Harbor High School, she was a 2015 CIF CIF California State Meet finalist at 300 meters hurdles after competing in the 2015 CIF Southern Section track and field championships.

Bender won 100 meters hurdles at 2015 Mt. SAC Relays in 14.69.

Bender placed 2nd in the 100 m hurdles at 2015 Arcadia Invitational.

Hope Bender's best times were 200 m - 25.40 s, 400 m - 57.09 s, 100 m hurdles - 14.35 s, 300 m hurdles - 42.18 s, shot put - , and long jump - .

Bender competed in Motocross from 5–10 years old and Equestrian through 10th grade.

References

External links
 
 
 Videos - Hope Bender 7th Women's Heptathlon 5725 Points - Azusa - Published on April 20, 2018 Runnerspace DyeStatCal
 Hope Bender at University of California Santa Barbara
 
 Hope Bender – Newport HS at California Milesplit
 It Fitz #19 - 2019 NCAA Multi-Events Recap - Hope Bender Joins - Ft. A. Zamzow / J. Erm / M. Clark Athletic Experience Podcast

1996 births
Living people
American heptathletes
UC Santa Barbara Gauchos women's track and field athletes
Sportspeople from Newport Beach, California
Track and field athletes from California
American female sprinters
American female hurdlers